The Meritorious service medal for personnel of the Belgian Defence Forces and Foreign Armed Forces is a military decoration of Belgium. It was established on 23 February 2005 as a more rewarding successor of an earlier Medal of Military Merit (created in 1988) and is awarded to members of the Belgian Armed Forces and civilians working for the Belgian Defence who show an exemplary meritorious behaviour in the completion of their duties or who have accomplished an exemplary meritorious act.

The medal may also be awarded to foreign military and civilian members of a foreign Armed Force who have provided exceptional support to the Belgian Defence.
 
The Meritorious service medal is awarded by royal decree.

History 
The original Medal for Military Merit was created in 1988 by ministerial decree and awarded internally within the Ministry of Defence. However, the creation of the medal was presented to the Council of State under the form of a ministerial decree and the Council ruled that the creation of such an award should be done by the King, thus via a Royal Decree. Therefore a new Meritorious Service Medal with a slightly different official name was created in its place in 2005, that was to be awarded by the King of Belgium. As the original Medal for Military Merit had already been awarded a number of times, the Royal Decree provided retroactively that the original medal is to be considered as equivalent to the new one.

Award Criteria

Belgian Military Personnel
The Meritorious Service Medal is awarded by the King based on a proposal from the Secretary of Defence, the Chief of Defence or an officer with the authority of Corps Commander or above, for award to a person who: 
 is more productive than most of their colleagues;
 tries to achieve perfection in their daily work;
 has on their own initiative achieved something to the benefit of the Belgian Armed Forces;
 has not had any previous penal or disciplinary sanctions;
 behaves in an exemplary manner; and
 takes into account human and social issues in their work.

One cannot be awarded the Meritorious Service Medal if one has already been awarded the Civic Decoration, the Military Decoration for gallantry or exceptional devotion or the medal of the Carnegie Hero Fund for the same acts.

Award ceremonies are usually held only once a year, the medal is rare, with barely four to eleven yearly recipients. In the period 2009-2013, the Medal for Military Merit was awarded 55 times.
The medal can only be awarded once to the same individual.
When personnel receives a severe punishment, multiple light punishments or when they act in a way that is deemed unbecoming and has been punished accordingly, the King can revoke the award of the meritorious service medal.

Personnel of Non-Belgian Armed Forces
The meritorious service medal may be awarded to military and civilian personnel of non-Belgian armed forces when they have collaborated exceptionally with and provided extraordinary support to the Belgian Defence.
The Belgian regulation stipulate explicitly that such an award is exceptional.
In order to receive the award, the awardee must:
 Be in active duty at the time of the act
 Not have been awarded the medal of the Carnegie Hero Fund or the Civic Decoration for the same acts

The award of the medal to a foreign service member can be done by:
 The Belgian Secretary of Defence
 The Belgian Chief of Defence
 A Belgian Commanding Officer in a multinational service, including in a foreign operation theatre.
 A Commanding Officer of a combat branch or major staff

Appearance 
The medal is circular and struck from bronze, the obverse bears the Escutcheon-only version of the Coat of arms of Belgium, the plain reverse usually bears the engraved name of the recipient and date of the award.  The medal is suspended to the ribbon by a ring though the suspension loop.  The ribbon is light blue with four vertical white stripes. The original Medal for Military Merit had the same design and hung from the same ribbon as the new one, only the statute differs.

Recipients (partial list)
Lieutenant Yves Bertholet
Sergeant Yoann Severijns
Master Corporal J.-P. Doyen
Warrant Officer G. Verlent
Master Warrant Officer G. Lenders
Chief Warrant Officer P. Istas
First Sergeant-Major Jozef Van Lancker
Corporal D. Tricot
Major I. Dupont
First Master Corporal Bruno Coenen
Warrant Officer Pascal Blanchart
Master Corporal Sean Vereecken
Major Danny Snelders
Chief Warrant Officer Stefaan Mouton
Lieutenant Luc Gille
Private First Class Timothy De Mars
Master Warrant Officer Patrick Vermeulen

Foreign recipients
Brigadier General Philippe Léonard (France)
Colonel Mark E. Carter (USA)
Major Anthony F. Sidoti (USA)

See also
 List of Orders, Decorations and Medals of the Kingdom of Belgium
 List of Medal of Military Merit (Belgium) Recipients

References

Other sources
 Quinot H., 1950, Recueil illustré des décorations belges et congolaises, 4e Edition. (Hasselt)
 Cornet R., 1982, Recueil des dispositions légales et réglementaires régissant les ordres nationaux belges. 2e Ed. N.pl.,  (Brussels)
 Borné A.C., 1985, Distinctions honorifiques de la Belgique, 1830-1985 (Brussels)
 Belgian military regulation DGHR-REG-DISPSYS-001 of 20 February 2006
 Belgian military regulation DGHR-SPS-DECOR-001 of 18 January 2006
 Report of written questions and answers in the Belgian House of Representatives, 17 March 2014 (QRVA 53-152)

External links
Bibliothèque royale de Belgique (In French)
Les Ordres Nationaux Belges (In French)

Military awards and decorations of Belgium
Awards established in 1988
Awards established in 2005